Susan K. Mashiko is a retired United States Air Force major general who served as the Deputy Director, National Reconnaissance Office, Chantilly, Virginia. Her responsibilities include assisting the director and principal deputy director in managing the strategic and tactical operations of the NRO. Also, as the commander, Air Force Space Command Element, she manages all air force personnel and resources assigned to the NRO and serves as the senior adviser to the DNRO on all military matters.  Mashiko is the first Japanese American woman to be promoted to flag rank.

Early life 
Mashiko was born in Glendale, California.

Education 
Mashiko earned a bachelor's degree in aeronautical engineering from U.S. Air Force Academy. In 1986, Mashiko earned a Master of Science degree in Electrical Engineering from Air Force Institute of Technology.

Career 
Mashiko's career has spanned a wide variety of space and acquisition assignments, including chief of the Programs Division in the Office of Special Projects, executive officer to the Department of Defense Space Architect, and Director of the Evolved Expendable Launch Vehicle System Program. She has also served as the program executive officer for Environmental Satellites; commander, MILSATCOM Systems Wing; and vice commander, Space and Missile Systems Center. Prior to her current assignment, she was director, space acquisition, Office of the Under Secretary of the Air Force, Washington, D.C.

In July 2014, Mashiko retired as Deputy Director of National Reconnaissance Office.

Major awards and decorations
Her major awards and decorations include:

1998 John J. Welch Award for Excellence in Acquisition Management, Secretary of the Air Force
1998 Strategic Acquisition Reform Award for Contracting Excellence, Secretary of the Air Force
1999 David W. Packard Award for Acquisition Excellence, Department of Defense
2003 Unit of the Year (Director), Air Force Association

This article contains information from the United States Federal Government and is in the public domain.

Dates of promotion
Second Lieutenant - May 28, 1980
First Lieutenant - May 28, 1982
Captain - May 28, 1984
Major - Oct 1, 1991
Lieutenant Colonel - Nov 1, 1996
Colonel - March 1, 2001
Brigadier General - September 7, 2006
Major General  - November 20, 2009

References

Living people
National Reconnaissance Office personnel
United States Air Force Academy alumni
Dwight D. Eisenhower School for National Security and Resource Strategy alumni
Recipients of the Legion of Merit
Recipients of the Defense Distinguished Service Medal
Female generals of the United States Air Force
Year of birth missing (living people)
American military personnel of Japanese descent
21st-century American women